The German Women's Council is a German umbrella organization for organizations concerned with women's rights and gender equality. It includes around 60 member organizations. It was founded in 1951 and views itself as a successor of the Bund Deutscher Frauenvereine, itself founded in 1894. The German Women's Council also initiated the establishment of the CEDAW Alliance Germany. Since 2021 Beate von Miquel has served as president of the organization.

See also
National Women's Council of Ireland
Norwegian Women's Lobby

References

External links 
German Women's Council

Feminist organisations in Germany
Women's rights organizations
Organizations established in 1951
1951 establishments in Germany